William Aitcheson Haswell  (5 August 1854 – 24 January 1925) was a Scottish-Australian zoologist specialising in crustaceans, winner of the 1915 Clarke Medal.

His zoological author abbreviation is Haswell. Taxa authored by him are given in :Category:Taxa named by William Aitcheson Haswell and by this query.



Early life
Haswell was born at Gayfield House, Edinburgh, son of James Haswell, banker, and his wife Margaret, née Cranston. Haswell studied at the Edinburgh Institution and the University of Edinburgh (M.A., 1877; BSc, 1878; D.Sc., 1887) where he won seven medals, and at the conclusion of his course gained the Bell-Baxter scholarship as the most distinguished natural science student of his year. Amongst his teachers were Thomas Henry Huxley, Archibald Geikie and Charles Wyville Thomson. He qualified for the MA and BSc degrees in 1878, and immediately afterwards, for reasons of health, went on a voyage to Australia.

Career
Haswell arrived in Sydney in late 1878 and soon began work in a small marine zoological laboratory at Watsons Bay. There he researched the collections from the Chevert expedition to New Guinea, and the marine fauna of Port Jackson and the adjacent coast.
Haswell was elected a member of the Linnean Society of New South Wales in April 1879, when he had already contributed five papers to the Proceedings. He accepted a post as curator at the Queensland Museum in Brisbane, but moved back to Sydney after one year in the position. In 1881 he collected specimens along the tropical coast of Queensland as a guest on HMS Alert. In 1881 Sir William Macleay arranged for him to give a course of public lectures on zoology. At the University of Sydney, he was appointed professor of biology in 1889.

Haswell was acting-curator of the Australian museum for part of 1882, and compiled a Catalogue of the Australian Stalk- and Sessile-eyed Crustacea which was published in that year. In the same year he was appointed demonstrator, and later, lecturer, in the subjects of zoology, comparative anatomy, and histology at the university of Sydney. He was much interested in the fauna of the New South Wales coast, and especially in the Crustacea, Annelida and Bryozoa, but also did other work covering a wide field. When the Challis professorship of biology was founded in 1889, Haswell was given the position and held it until its division in 1913. In 1893 he published in the Macleay Memorial Volume "A Monograph of the Temnocephaleae", a group which retained his interest for the remainder of his life. He collaborated with Charles Hedley and Sir Joseph Verco in investigating the continental shelf.

In January 1898 appeared Haswell's best known publication A Text Book of Zoology (London) written in conjunction with Thomas Jeffery Parker of the University of Otago, New Zealand. Despite being over 1400 pages, the book was described by the authors as being "strictly adapted to the needs of the beginner". On account of Parker's death the second edition of this standard textbook, which appeared in 1910, was prepared by Haswell, as was also the edition which came out in January 1922. A fourth edition was released in 1928 and it remained a standard in Australian zoology courses for decades. He also published a Manual of Zoology in 1899 which was reprinted in 1908. In 1913 a chair of botany was created at the university of Sydney and Haswell became professor of zoology.

Late life and legacy
Haswell resigned his office at the end of 1917 and was appointed professor emeritus. He continued doing research work until shortly before his death from heart disease at Sydney on 24 January 1925. In 1894 Haswell had married Josephine Gordon, daughter of W. G. Rich, who survived him with a daughter. Haswell was elected a fellow of the Royal Society, London, in 1897. In 1915 the Royal Society of New South Wales awarded him the Clarke Medal. In addition to the works already mentioned Haswell contributed a large number of papers to scientific journals. No fewer than 74 of these were published in the Proceedings of the Linnean Society of New South Wales. He was a member of the council of this society from 1881 until his death, and was its president for the years 1891–2 and 1892–3. He was also a trustee of the Australian museum for 33 years.

Haswell was shy and unassuming, with a quiet sense of humour and much appreciation of a good story. On vacation he was fond of fly-fishing and golf, but generally he was an unceasing worker, collecting himself the materials for his researches, and making his own drawings. The Text-Book of Zoology in which he had so large a share was an excellent piece of work, clearly written and concise, a remarkable piece of scholarship which in its own way could hardly have been excelled. Many generations of students in Great Britain, America and Australia, laid the foundations of their knowledge of zoology on this book. Haswell was himself a good and sound teacher, and at the time of his death, in four out of the six universities of Australia, the chair of zoology or biology was held by one of his former students.

Haswell Place, a residential street in the Canberra suburb of Chifley, is named after him.

Family 
In 1894 Haswell married Josephine Gordon Rich at St Luke's Church in Christchurch, New Zealand. Rich had been a student of Haswell's colleague TJ Parker. Although Rich herself did not publish again after her marriage, she continued her interest in science by assisting his research. The couple had one daughter, Mary.

Publications 
Among the publications of William Aitcheson Haswell are:
 
  ( in 2 volumes).
  <ref name=reviewParkerHaswell1899>Review of Parker & Haswell 1899 in The Zoologist,  4th series, vol 4, issue 705 (March, 1900), 149/150.</ref>

 References 

 Sources 
Patricia Morison, 'Haswell, William Aitcheson (1854–1925)', Australian Dictionary of Biography'', Volume 9, MUP, 1983, pp 226–227. Retrieved 22 January 2009

 Australian Malacostraca page with some information on W. A. Haswell.
Biographical Etymology of Marine Organism Names – H.

External link 
Digitising Haswells Museum

1854 births
1925 deaths
Scientists from Edinburgh
People educated at Stewart's Melville College
Alumni of the University of Edinburgh
Australian marine biologists
Australian zoologists
Australian carcinologists
Fellows of the Royal Society
Members of the Linnean Society of New South Wales
Scottish emigrants to Australia
Scottish zoologists
Scottish marine biologists
People educated at Stewart's Melville College#